Sikke Bruinsma (5 April 1889 – 27 February 1963) was a Dutch sports shooter. He competed in the 25 m rapid fire pistol event at the 1924 Summer Olympics.

References

External links
 

1889 births
1963 deaths
Dutch male sport shooters
Olympic shooters of the Netherlands
Shooters at the 1924 Summer Olympics
Sportspeople from Friesland
People from Skarsterlân